The Lakhudiyar Caves are located in the Barechhina village at the banks of the Suyal River in the Almora district of Uttarakhand. On the walls of the caves are paintings depicting animals, humans and also tectiforms, created with fingers in black, red and white. There are also a few animal motifs, one of them closely resembling a fox. Wavy lines, rectangle-filled 

geometric designs and groups of dots are seen here. These paintings provide one of the richest experiences of Prehistoric art in the country.  The caves have become a historically significant site.

History 

Lakhudiyar is a rock shelter which were the rescue spot of early man to save them from harsh climate. Lakhudiyar means 'one lakh caves'. These walls depict the life and the surroundings of the early man.

Location 

Barechhina is situated at 29°38′32″N 79°44′51″E. This village is about  far from main Almora city.

Paintings 
The paintings are mostly drawings of people, animals and weapons used by early man. On one side of the wall is the painting of people who have been shown performing a mass dance in a group of 34 people on one side and 28 people on the other. These picture also depicted the clothes and domesticated animals, and are believed to represent life in the prehistoric village. Two painted rock shelters reveal paintings of animals and humans drawn with finger in black, red and white.

These images have now become a tourist attraction. It is also the site for archaeological rock engraving being studied by Indira Gandhi National Centre for the Arts which is located in  New Delhi.

References 

Caves of Uttarakhand
Geography of India
Prehistoric art in India
Almora district